Wuzhou (postal: Wuchow), formerly Ngchow, is a prefecture-level city in the east of Guangxi Zhuang Autonomous Region, People's Republic of China.

Geography and climate

Wuzhou is located in eastern Guangxi bordering Guangdong province. It is at the confluence of the Gui River and the Xun River where they form the Xi River; 85% of all water in Guangxi flows through Wuzhou.

The Tropic of Cancer bisects the city. Despite its latitude, Wuzhou has a monsoon-influenced humid subtropical climate (Köppen Cfa), with short, mild winters, and long, very hot and humid summers. Winter begins dry but becomes progressively wetter and cloudier. Spring is generally overcast and often rainy, while summer continues to be rainy though is the sunniest time of year. Autumn is sunny and dry. The annual rainfall is just above , and is delivered in bulk (~47%) from April to June, when the plum rains occur and often create the risk of flooding. With monthly percent possible sunshine ranging from 17% in March to 55% in July, the city receives 1,738 hours of bright sunshine annually.

Demographics
According to the 2020 Chinese census, its total population was 2,820,977 inhabitants of whom 859,815 lived in its built-up (or metro) area made of 3 urban districts. the average annual population decrease for the period 2010-2020 was of -0.21% whilst overall decrease rate is -2.12%.

The dominant ethnic group in the prefecture-level city is Han Chinese but there are also Zhuang, Yao and others. Wuzhou traditionally belongs to the Cantonese cultural and linguistic region, so most people speak the Wuzhou dialect of Cantonese and Mandarin as a result of Central Government's Mandarin promotion policy.

Administration
Wuzhou has 3 counties, 1 county-level city  and 3 districts.

 Dieshan District was abolished on 2013

Delicacies

Amongst the agricultural products produced in the region of Wuzhou, one of the most favoured snacks is Wuzhou honey date. Guilinggao jelly is also described as a "Wuzhou delicacy". Bingquan Soy Milk (冰泉豆浆) is also welcomed by people and is in the list of premium choices for breakfast.

Trade
Wuzhou has become a hub of the synthetic gemstone trade, particularly specializing in corundum, spinel and cubic zirconia.

Transportation
High Speed Railway
Nanning–Guangzhou high-speed railway

Railway
Luozhan Railway

Expressway
Nanwu Expressway

Highway
China National Highway 207
China National Highway 321

Air
Wuzhou Xijiang Airport

References

 
Cities in Guangxi
Prefecture-level divisions of Guangxi
National Forest Cities in China